Kavitha is a 1962 Indian, Tamil language film directed by T. R. Raghunath. The film stars M. R. Radha and Rajasulochana.

Plot
Kavitha is the daughter of a rich man, Sabapathy Mudaliar. She loves Durai, an artist. Mudaliar falls sick. He wants Kavitha to marry his sister's son, Rajasekaran who lives in Malaysia. Caught between love and affection, Kavitha feels it is important to save her father's love and sacrifices her love. She is married to Rajasekaran. But soon she finds that he drinks too much. He demands for more and more money and beats her if she refuses. Mudaliar is worried. In the meantime, another woman, Ponnamma, who is a look alike of Kavitha enters the family. She consoles Kavitha and tries to advise Rajasekaran. But Rajasekaran sends Kavitha to a mental hospital and shows Ponnamma as Kavitha to Mudaliar. Now Kavitha and suspects the true identity of Rajasekaran. Ponnamma, who knows the truth about Rajasekaran's identity, is unable to reveal it to Mudaliar as she is acting as Kavitha. However, Ponnamma falls sick and dies. In the meantime, Durai and Gomathi who is Kavitha's cousin and Leela who is Kavitha's friend are trying to find the true identity of Rajasekaran. How they do it and rescues Kavitha forms the rest of the story.

Cast
List adapted from the database of Film News Anandan and from the song book.

Male cast
M. R. Radha
M. N. Nambiar
S. V. Ranga Rao
T. S. Balaiah

Female cast
Rajasulochana (in Dual roles)
Pandari Bai
Pushpalatha
Seethalakshmi
Vidyavathy 

Dance
Ragini
Harban Lal

Production
The film was produced by Modern Theatres and was directed by T. R. Raghunath. Story and dialogues were written by Murasoli Maran. R. Sampath was in charge of cinematography while L. Balu handled the editing. Art direction was by B. Nagarajan. Hiralal and P. Jayaram did the choreography. Still photography was done by A. J. Joseph. Rajasulochana featured in dual roles in this film.

Soundtrack
Music was composed by K. V. Mahadevan while the lyrics were penned by A. Maruthakasi and Kannadasan.

References

External links

Indian drama films
Films scored by K. V. Mahadevan
Films directed by T. R. Raghunath
1962 drama films
1962 films
1960s Tamil-language films